Christian Moller may refer to:

Christian Möller, German artist and painter
Christian Moeller, German-American sculpture and installation artist and academic
Christian Møller, Danish chemist and physicist